Pa Sak is a tambon (subdistrict) of Wang Chin District, in Phrae Province, Thailand. In 2019 it had a total population of 5,362 people.

History
The subdistrict was created effective November 5, 1990 by splitting off 5 administrative villages from Soi.

Administration

Central administration
The tambon is subdivided into 10 administrative villages (muban).

Local administration
The whole area of the subdistrict is covered by the subdistrict administrative organization (SAO) Pa Sak (องค์การบริหารส่วนตำบลป่าสัก).

References

External links
Thaitambon.com on Pa Sak

Populated places in Phrae province